Karawang United Football Club (simply known as KUFC or Karawang United) is an Indonesian football club based in Karawang Regency, West Java. They currently compete in the Liga 3.

References

External links

Karawang Regency
Sport in West Java
Football clubs in Indonesia
Football clubs in West Java
Association football clubs established in 2020
2020 establishments in Indonesia